This is a timeline of Mexican history, comprising important legal and territorial changes and political events and improvements in Mexico and its predecessor states.  To read about the background to these events, see history See also the list of heads of state of Mexico and list of years in Mexico.

16th century

18th century

19th century

20th century

21st century

See also
 List of years in Mexico

Cities in Mexico
 Timeline of Acapulco
 Timeline of Aguascalientes city
 Timeline of Campeche city
 Timeline of Chihuahua city
 Timeline of Guadalajara
 Timeline of Guanajuato city
 Timeline of Ciudad Juárez
 Timeline of León
 Timeline of Mérida
 Timeline of Mexico City
 Timeline of Monterrey
 Timeline of Puebla city
 Timeline of Tijuana
 Timeline of Villahermosa

Further reading

References

External links
 

 
Mexico
Mexico history-related lists
Years in Mexico